The Grammy Award for Best Contemporary Performance by a Chorus was awarded in 1969 (as Best Contemporary Pop Performance, Chorus) and in 1970.  In some years, the Grammy Award for Best Pop Performance by a Duo or Group with Vocal also included performances by a chorus.

A similar award for Best Performance by a Chorus was awarded from 1961 to 1968.  This was also in the pop field, but did not specify pop music.

Years reflect the year in which the Grammy Awards were presented, for works released in the previous year.

Recipients

References

Contemporary Performance by a Chorus